This is a list of areas and neighbourhoods in Chennai by region. The city is divided on the basis of composition into four major parts: North, Central, South and West. North Chennai is primarily an industrial area while some areas are residential. Central Chennai is the commercial heart of the city and the downtown area. South Chennai and West Chennai, previously predominantly residential areas are fast turning into commercial areas, hosting a large number of IT and financial companies along the GST Road, OMR and NH 48. North Chennai ends with the area Red Hills, West Chennai ends with the area Tiruninravur, South Chennai ends with the area Vandalur.

North Chennai
 Red Hills 
 Royapuram
 Korukkupet
 Vyasarpadi
 Perambur 
 Tondiarpet
 Tiruvottiyur
 Ennore
 Minjur
 Old Washermenpet
 Madhavaram
 Manali New Town
 Naravarikuppam
 Sowcarpet
 Puzhal
 Moolakadai
 Central
 Kodungaiyur
 Madhavaram Milk Colony
 Mathur MMDA
 Kolathur
 Surapet
 Parry's Corner
 Manali
 Vallalar Nagar 
 New Washermenpet
 Mannadi
 George Town
 Basin Bridge
 Park Town
 Periamet
 Pattalam
 Pulianthope
 M.K.B. Nagar
 Selavoyal
 Manjambakkam
 Ponniammanmedu
 Sembiam
 T.V.K. Nagar
 ICF Colony
 Lakshmipuram
 Kathivakkam
 Kathirvedu
 Erukanchery
 Broadway
 Jamalia, Chennai
 Kosapet
 Otteri

West Chennai
 Porur
 manapakkam
 Anna Nagar
 Aminjikarai
 Ayanavaram
 Ambattur
 Kundrathur
 Defence Colony
 Mannurpet
 Padi
 Ayappakkam
 Korattur
 Mogappair
 Arumbakkam
 Avadi
 Pudur
 Maduravoyal
 Koyambedu
 Ashok Nagar
 K.K. Nagar
 Karambakkam
 Vadapalani
 Saligramam
 Virugambakkam
 Alwarthirunagar
 Valasaravakkam
 Thirunindravur
 Pattabiram
 Thirumangalam
 Thirumullaivayal
 Thiruverkadu
 Nandambakkam
 Nerkundrum
 Nesapakkam
 Nolambur
 Ramapuram
 Mugalivakkam
 Mangadu
 M.G.R. Nagar
 M.G.R. Garden
 Alapakkam
 Poonamallee
 Mowlivakkam
 Gerugambakkam
 CMDA Colony
 Thirumazhisai
 Iyyapanthangal
 Annanur

South and East Chennai
 Teynampet
 Thousand Lights
 Gopalapuram
 Mylapore
 Chromepet
 Egmore
 Chetpet
 Perungudi
 Sholinganallur
 Alandur
Adambakkam
 Adyar
 Besant Nagar
 Triplicane
 T. Nagar
 Thiruvanmiyur
 Saidapet
 Guindy
 Madipakkam
 Nanganallur
 Velachery
 Taramani
 Pallikaranai
 Keelkattalai
 Kovilambakkam
 Thoraipakkam
 Neelankarai
 Injambakkam
 Hastinapuram
 Pallavaram
 Pozhichur
 Pammal
 Nagalkeni
 Tambaram
 Selaiyur
 Irumbuliyur
 Kadaperi
 Perungalathur
 Pazhavanthangal
 Peerkankaranai
 Mudichur
 Vandalur
 Kolappakkam
 Mambakkam
 Palavakkam 
 Varadharajapuram
 Medavakkam
 West Mambalam
 Kottivakkam
 Pudupet

Suburban Chennai
Suburban Chennai includes almost half of the places in the districts of Kancheepuram, Tiruvallur, Ranipet and Chengalpattu. Together with the Chennai City district, they form the Chennai metropolitan area.

Northern Suburbs of Chennai
 Gummidipoondi
 Pazhaverkadu
 Ponneri
 Athipattu
 Sholavaram
 Minjur
 Red Hills
 Ennore

Western Suburbs of Chennai
 Tiruvallur
 Kadambathur
 Arakkonam
 Tiruttani
 Tamaraipakkam
 Sriperumbudur

Southern-Eastern  Suburbs of Chennai 
 Chembarambakkam
 Singaperumalkoil
 Maraimalai nagar
 Urapakkam
 Guduvanchery

Suburbs along ECR and OMR of Chennai
 Karapakkam
 Kanathur
 Uthandi
 Muthukadu
 Kelambakkam
 Kovalam
 Siruseri

Satellite Towns
Although technically not belonging to the Chennai Metropolitan area, many of these satellite towns are referred to as being within Chennai.

The State government will decide on the expansion of the Chennai Metropolitan Area (CMA) before the end of this fiscal, R. Vaithilingam, Minister for Housing and Urban Development, told the Assembly on 25 August 2011. In view of the fast-paced development taking place in areas beyond the present metropolitan area jurisdiction, like Sriperumbudur, Kelambakkam, Tiruvallur and Mahabalipuram, it had become necessary to review the Chennai Metropolitan Planning Area that was notified in 1973-74, he said.

 Gummidipoondi (NH 5)
 Tiruvallur (NH 205)
 Sriperumpudur (NH 48)
 Mahabalipuram (ECR)
 Chengalpattu (NH 45, GST Road)

Important Roads of Chennai
 Anna Salai (Mount Road) (NH-45)
 Poonamallee High Road (NH-48)
 Inner Ring Road (100 Feet road or Jawaharlal Nehru road) (SH-2)
 Kamaraj Salai (Marina Beach road)
 Cenotaph Road
 North Usman Road
 South Usman Road
 Bazullah Road
 Chennai byepass road (puzhal-perungalathur)
 Habibullah Road
 Arcot Road (SH-113)
 Mount-Poonamallee Road (SH-55)
 Nungambakkam High Road
 Outer Ring Road
 Peters Road
 Sardar Patel Road
 Smith Road
 Whites Road
 Pallavaram - Kundrathur - Poonamallee Road
 Kundrathur to porur road
 Pallavaram - Thuraipakkam Radial Road
 Velachery Main Road
 Vanagaram-Ambattur-Puzhal Road
 Tambaram Mudichur road (SH-48)
 East Coast Road (SH-49)
 Rajiv Gandhi Salai (Old Mahabalipuram Road) (SH-49A)
 Chennai-Tiruvallur High Road (NH-205)
 Erukkancherry High Road (NH-5)
 Grand Southern Trunk Road (GST Road) (NH-45)
 GST Road
 Avadi- Poonamalle- St. Thomas mount High road (SH-55)
 Old Mahabalipuram Road (OMR)
 200 feet Radial Road
 Poonamallee - Thiruninravur (SH-50)
 Poonamallee - Pattabiram High road (SH-206)
 Wallajah Road, Chennai
 Grand Northern Trunk Road (GNT Road) (NH-5)

Chennai neighbourhood coordinates

References 

neighbourhoods
Chennai